The keyboard glockenspiel (French: jeu de timbre) or organ glockenspiel is an instrument consisting of a glockenspiel operated by a piano keyboard. It was first used by George Frideric Handel in the oratorio Saul (1739). It was also used in the 1739 revivals of his Il Trionfo del Tempo and Acis and Galatea, and the next year in L'Allegro, il Penseroso ed il Moderato. Half a century later, Wolfgang Amadeus Mozart employed a strumento d’acciaio in The Magic Flute (1791) to represent Papageno's magic bells, and this instrument is believed to have been a keyboard glockenspiel. This part is nowadays sometimes taken by a celesta. Maurice Ravel preferred the keyboard version of the instrument because it can play a true ff dynamic for brilliance and iridescence in orchestral climaxes. In the late 20th century, the firm of Bergerault began manufacturing a three-octave (F2–E4) mallet instrument with a damping mechanism operated by a foot pedal, which is capable of dealing with the wide range called for in contemporary scores.

Use

More recently, the keyboard glockenspiel has been used by:
 Danny Federici of the E Street Band in numerous concerts and recordings
 Richard Wagner in his opera Die Walküre
 Giacomo Meyerbeer in his opera L'Africaine
 Léo Delibes in his opera Lakmé
 Jules Massenet in his oratorio La Vierge
 Giacomo Puccini in his operas Turandot and Madama Butterfly
 Richard Strauss in his tone-poem Don Juan
 Claude Debussy in La Mer
 Maurice Ravel in Daphnis et Chloé and Ma mère l'oye
 Ottorino Respighi in the Pines of Rome
 Kurt Atterberg in his Sixth Symphony
 Arthur Honegger in his Fourth Symphony
 Olivier Messiaen in his Turangalîla-Symphonie (where it appears along with celesta)
 Karlheinz Stockhausen in his Gruppen (1955–57), some versions of Refrain (1959) and Punkte (1969–93).
 Gryphon on their albums Midnight Mushrumps (1974) and Raindance (1975).
 Henri Dutilleux in L'arbre des songes (1985).

Position in the orchestra
Owing to the skills required of the player, the keyboard glockenspiel is placed in the keyboard section of the orchestra rather than the percussion section, and is similarly not regarded as a keyboard percussion instrument. It is however regarded as pitched percussion in organology.

References

Sources
Blades, James, and James Holland. 2001. "Glockenspiel (i)". The New Grove Dictionary of Music and Musicians, second edition, edited by Stanley Sadie and John Tyrrell. London: Macmillan Publishers.
Del Mar, Norman. 1983. Anatomy of the Orchestra, first paperback edition, with revisions. Berkeley and Los Angeles: University of California Press. 
Schuller, Gunther. 1997. The Compleat Conductor. Oxford and New York: Oxford University Press. .

Bells (percussion)
Keyboard instruments
Struck idiophones
Orchestral percussion instruments
Pitched percussion instruments
German musical instruments
English musical instruments
French musical instruments
Italian musical instruments
Swiss musical instruments